G.D. Interclube (handball) is a men's handball team from Angola. The club competes at the Luanda Provincial Handball Championship and at the Angola National Handball Championship as well as at continental level, at the annual African Handball Champions League competitions.

Honours
National Championship:
Winner (1): 1989
 Runner Up (4) : 2010, 2011, 2013, 2015
Angola Cup :
Winner (5): 2010, 2011, 2012, 2014, 2016
 Runner Up (1) : 2013
Angola Super Cup :
Winner (4): 2011, 2013, 2014, 2015
 Runner Up (3) : 2010, 2012, 2016
African Cup Winner's Cup :
Winner (0): 
 Runner Up (1) : 2010

Squad

Players

2011–2018

Manager history
  Victor Tchikoulaev – 2017, 2018
  Alexandre Machado Careca – 2016
  Tony Costa – 2014, 2015
  Luís Chaves – 2010

See also
Interclube Football
Interclube Basketball
Angolan Handball Federation

References

External links
Official blog 

Angolan handball clubs
Handball clubs established in 1976
1976 establishments in Angola
Sports clubs in Luanda